Constituency NA-177 (Muzaffargarh-II) is a constituency for the National Assembly of Pakistan. It comprised mainly areas of Muzaffargarh Tehsil and Kot Addu Tehsil. After the 2018 delimitations, this constituency, along with its neighboring NA-176, were broken up into three constituencies - NA-181, NA-182 (which also includes city of Muzaffargarh from old NA-178), and NA-183.

Election 2002 

General elections were held on 10 Oct 2002. Hina Rabbani Khar of PML-Q won by 46,752 votes.

Election 2008 

General elections were held on 18 Feb 2008. Hina Rabbani Khar  of PPP won by 84,916 votes.

Election 2013 

General elections were held on 11 May 2013. Mr. Ghulam Rabbani Khar of PPP won the seat and became the member of National Assembly.

References

External links 
Election result's official website

NA-177
Abolished National Assembly Constituencies of Pakistan

Constituencies of Muzaffargarh
Politics of Muzaffargarh
Constituencies of Pakistan